Baude Cordier was a French composer in the  style of late medieval music. Virtually nothing is known of Cordier's life, aside from an inscription on one of his works which indicates he was born in Rheims and had a Master of Arts. Some scholars identify him with Baude Fresnel, a harpist and organist in the court of Philip the Bold, though other scholars have rejected this.

He is best known for his unique and experimental notational methods, often with shapes relating to the subject matter. These include a heart-shaped staff in Belle, Bonne, Sage, a rondeau about love, and numerous circles in the Tout par compas suy composés rondeau. Such an approach is thought to have inspired later composers, ranging from Gilles Binchois to Karlheinz Stockhausen.

Identity
It has been suggested that Cordier was the pen name of Baude Fresnel.

Music

Cordier's works are considered among the prime examples of ars subtilior. In line with that cultural trend, he was fond of using red note notation, also known as coloration, a technique stemming from the general practice of mensural notation. The change in color adjusts the rhythm of a particular note from its usual form. (This musical style and type of notation has also been termed "mannerism" and "mannered notation.")

Ten of Cordier's secular pieces survive, most of which are rondeaux:
 some are in the rhythmically complex late fourteenth-century French style of ars subtilior, such as "Amans amés secretement" (Lovers, love discreetly).
 others are simpler, with greater emphasis on lyrical melody, such as "Belle, Bonne, Sage", also transcribed in HAM, and characterized with "Amans" as a rondeau.

Two of the composer's chansons are in the Chantilly Manuscript and are well-known examples of eye music:
 the love song "Belle, Bonne, Sage" ("Beautiful, Good, Wise"). The manuscript is in the shape of a heart.

 a circular canon "Tout par compas suy composés" ("With a compass was I composed")—more eye music, in which the manuscript is written in a circle.

Many commentators have speculated that Cordier's unique and experimental notation inspired certain notation by later composers, such that in as Refrain by Karlheinz Stockhausen, and Gilles Binchois's Je ne pouroye. Cordier's work was among the earliest Western compositions to include performance instructions to explain how to use the specialized notation.

His mass movement in the Apt MS is in the later, simpler fifteenth-century style.

Works

Editions
Cordier's works are included in the following collections:

See also
 Eye music

Notes

References

Sources
Books
 
 

Journals and articles

External links

 
 Works by Baude Cordier in the Medieval Music Database from La Trobe University
 
 

French composers
French classical composers
French male classical composers
Renaissance composers
Ars subtilior composers
14th-century births
15th-century deaths
15th-century French composers